Yvonne Oerlemans (31 December 1945 - 14 September 2012) was a Dutch sculptor and video artist who has been active in the field of video art, installations and objects since 1982. Oerlemans created a diverse oeuvre that has been exhibited worldwide. She studied at the Academy of Fine Arts in Hague (1974–79) and at the video workshop of the Jan van Eyck Academy in Maastricht (1983). In 1985 she was awarded a prize for her artistic career at the Aarhus International Video Festival & Competition. Oerlemans' early artworks deal with the human condition in a metaphorical and philosophical way. Her videos are characterized by a paradoxical sense of humor. The works are usually short, compact and mostly shot in a studio with a static camera.

Video artworks and Performances 
 1980 Najaar '80
 1981 Territorium
 1982 Visions
 1982 Inside - Outside
 1983 Corsetscyclus
 1983 Tempora mutantur et nos cum illis
 1983 The turning point
 1983 Administration
 1984 Pa-Ma-Triachaat
 1985 Changing landscape
 1987 The Titanic
 1987 Postcards
 1988 De appeleters
 1990 Brains
 1992 Metamorphosis nature
 1992 TV Chair (installation)
 1993 Selevaren op de Zaan
 1996 Crossing the Red Sea

Exhibition 
In 1991 she presented her solo exhibition at Artoteek Noord gallery, Amsterdam and in 2004 she participated in a group show "Farm" at Museum voor Moderne Kunst Arnhem - MMKA. Her works were mainly shown at international festivals, galleries, and museums in Europe and North America like the Audiovisual Experimental Festival(AVE), European Media Art Festival, Berlin International Film Festival, Imapkt Festival, Musée d'art contemporain de Montréal, Centre Pompidou, Stedelijk Museum Amsterdam. Her video artworks were also screened on TV programs in Europe, USA, and Canada.

Distribution of video artworks 

 LIMA, Amsterdam, The Netherlands
 235 Media GmbH, Cologne, Germany
 EMAF, Osnabrück, Germany
 Vidéographe, Montréal, Canada
 Vtape, Toronto, Canada
 Art Com TV, San Francisco, USA

Prize 

 1985 The first prize, International Video Festival & Competition, Aarhus, Denmark
 1991 Festival Prize, International Film and Video Art Festival, Award of the town of Györ, Hungary

Teaching 

 1987 Gast lecturer, Minerva Art Academy, Groningen, The Netherlands
 1988 Lecture, San Francisco Art Institute, USA
 1991-1992 Studio visit, St. JAM, Amsterdam, The Netherlands
 1994 Lecture, Musée d'Art Contemporain Montréal, Canada

References 

1945 births
2012 deaths
20th-century Dutch women artists
21st-century Dutch women artists
Dutch women sculptors
Dutch video artists
Royal Academy of Art, The Hague alumni